Alan Cheung (born 17 February 1997), also known as Alan King, is a Chinese American entrepreneur and fashion designer. King is the founder and CEO of AKINGS.

Career and entrepreneurship
King is the founder of fashion clothing brand AKINGS. He founded the brand in January 2016.

In 2017, AKINGS showed their autumn winter collection Soho, new york which was featured by The Source magazine.

In 2019, King was accepted into the Forbes Business Council.

In 2020 King announced his latest partnership with Forbes to launch a mastermind featured on Forbes new platform Forbes8.

In 2021, King appeared on the HBOmax series “THE HYPE” as a competing designer alongside celebrity judges such as Offest who were called “co-signers”.

In 2022, King announced his NFT Genesis Collection with a NYFW popup in New York City. 

In June of the same year, AKINGS hosted a party celebrating their upcoming NFT "Wear to Earn" collection amidst NFT.NYC week. The collection is not only an NFT digital wearable but also the brand's next-generation customer reward ecosystem. Each trading card presents holders with "Reward Boxes" consisting of tokens, physically redeemable clothes, VIP event invites, partner NFTs, and more.

In November 2022, Forbes named Alan and his company co-founder Bryan Leon among its 2023 30 Under 30: Art and Style alongside Hailey Bieber, Wisdom Kaye, and Ji Won Choi.

References

General references
 
 
 

Living people
2011 establishments in New York City
Clothing brands of the United States
Clothing companies based in New York City
American fashion designers
American fashion businesspeople
Menswear designers
Year of birth missing (living people)